(born April 29, 1973) is a male Japanese voice actor from Kanagawa Prefecture affiliated with Office Osawa. He was formerly affiliated with Office CHK.

Voice roles

Television animation
2001
Motto! Ojamajo Doremi (HR Professionals)
Super GALS! Kotobuki Ran (Clerk (ep 28), Neighborhood Association Chairman (ep 36), Teacher (ep 50) Vice Principal (ep 34), Wakayama (ep 46))
Fruits Basket (Principal (ep 14))

2002
Ojamajo Doremi DOKKAAN! (Shibata's Dog)
Happy Lesson (Kyoto)
Rizelmine (Papa A)
Digimon Frontier (2nd Goblimon, Physician)
UFO Ultramaiden Valkyrie (Ajiro)
Princess Tutu (Book Men, Judge (ep 16))
Haibane Renmei (Gentleman)

2003
Ashita no Nadja (Villager)
Zatch Bell! (Donpoccho)
Detective School Q (Mathematic Teacher)
Texhnolyze (Man, Yono)
Ikki Tousen (Gakushu)
Battle Programmer Shirase (Keibin/Guard)
UFO Ultramaiden Valkyrie 2: December Nocturne (Kendo Master)
Peacemaker Kurogane (Masterless Samurai (eps 1, 7, 13), Soba Noodle Vendor (ep 4))

2004
Yugo the Negotiator (Merenkofu)
Mermaid Melody Pichi Pichi Pitch (Dr. Somegorou (ep 71), Mehikari (ep 57), The Great One)
Gantz (Boy (ep 3), Gang Member B (ep 8), Hatanaka, Konta Man (ep 6), Yonekura)
Tsukuyomi: Moon Phase (Chief Editor (ep 7), Ramen Shop Man (ep 6))
Viewtiful Joe (Volcano)
Final Approach (Nishimori's Father)
Rockman.EXE Stream (Makita)
Bleach (Demoura Zodd)
Grenadier (General, Master of the Shop, Official)

2005
Glass Mask (Keiichi Kawaguchi)
Zoids: Genesis (Digaru Colonel)
Eureka Seven (Director, Goalkeeper)
Full Metal Panic! The Second Raid (Spec)
Canvas 2: Niji Iro no Sketch (TV)
Hell Girl (Shopkeeper (eps 5, 18))
Blood+ (Junichiro Inanime)
Noein: To Your Other Self (Doctor (ep 22))

2006
Tactical Roar (Commander-in-chief (ep 9))
Yoshinaga-san'chi no Gargoyle (Avery, Durahan)
BakéGyamon (Corner)
Princess Princess (Man)
Witchblade (Captain)
xxxHOLiC (Spirit (ep 3))
Project Blue Earth SOS (Robert)
Lovedol ~Lovely Idol~ (Sound Director)
Shōnen Onmyōji (Hozumi no Moronao)
Living for the Day After Tomorrow (Karada's father)
Kujibiki Unbalance (Employee)
Strain: Strategic Armored Infantry (Jake)

2007
Les Misérables: Shōjo Cosette (Staff of Government Buildings, Man Caught)
Getsumento Heiki Mina (Abudauto Alien)
Ikki Tousen: Dragon Destiny (Bunsoku Ukin)
Moribito: Guardian of the Spirit (Gambling stall holder (ep 10), Merchant (ep 10))
Bokurano (Sakuma)

2008
Porphy no Nagai Tabi (Guard)
Yatterman (Jouji's Grandfather (ep 23))
Blassreiter (Police Chief)
Ikki Tousen: Great Guardians (Gakushu)
Strike Witches (Medic (ep 2))
Yakushiji Ryōko no Kaiki Jikenbo (Ryojun Tadomura)
Live on Cardliver Kakeru (Q・B)
Ga-Rei: Zero (Commander (ep 1))

2009
Michiko & Hatchin (Chief (ep 19))
Chrome Shelled Regios (Gorneo Luckens)
Sora o Miageru Shōjo no Hitomi ni Utsuru Sekai (Principal)
Phantom: Requiem for the Phantom (Enho Ko)
Shangri-La (Minister Kato)
Tegami Bachi: Letter Bee (Kobyirofu)
InuYasha: The Final Act (Ryūjin)

2010
Dance in the Vampire Bund (Politician)
Ikki Tousen: Xtreme Xecutor (Gakushu)
Heroman (Cop)
The Legend of the Legendary Heroes (Tyle)
Zakuro (A-sama (eps 10, 12))

2011
Yu-Gi-Oh! Zexal (Nosferatu Nakajima)
Blue Exorcist (Bourguignon)
Manyū Hiken-chō (Valley in the Front)
Last Exile: Fam, The Silver Wing (Ernest Cirrus Lindemann)

2012
Queen's Blade Rebellion (Clan Leader (ep 1))
Blast of Tempest (Platoon Leader)
Code:Breaker (Hosa-kan)
Psycho-Pass (Young Man (ep 12))

2013
Hakkenden: Eight Dogs of the East (Akihiko's father)
Silver Spoon (Hirono Sensei)

2014
Yu-Gi-Oh! Arc-V (Nico Smiley)

2015
Marvel Disk Wars: The Avengers (Bi-Beast)

2023
Junji Ito Maniac: Japanese Tales of the Macabre (Shigorō)

Video games
Ace Combat: Assault Horizon (Jose 'Guts' Gutierrez)
Crash Nitro Kart (Dingodile)
Crash Twinsanity (Dingodile, Rusty Walrus)
Killer Is Dead (Giant Head)
Secret of Evangelion (Potter)
Sly Cooper (The Murray)

Drama CDs
Aka no Shinmon (Ikebe)

Tokusatsu
2009
Kamen Rider W (News, T-Rex Dopant (ep 1 - 2))
Tomica Hero Rescue Fire (Fire Phoenix AI, X-Dragon AI)
2012
Tokumei Sentai Go-Buster (Cutterloid (ep 4))
2013
Zyuden Sentai Kyoryuger (Debo Zaihon (ep 16), Debo Zaihodoron (ep 30))
2017
Uchu Sentai Kyuranger (Olmega (ep 19))
Ultraman Geed (Satan Zorg (ep 1))

Dubbing roles
Bad Lieutenant: Port of Call New Orleans (Donald "Big Fate" Godshaw (Xzibit))
Blue Thunder (Colonel F. E. Cochrane (Malcolm McDowell))
Bohemian Rhapsody (John Deacon (Joseph Mazzello))
Cymbeline (Pisanio (John Leguizamo))
Dagon (Howard (Brendan Price))
Deadwater Fell (DCI Spencer Collins (Gordon Brown))
Don't Worry Darling (Dean (Nick Kroll))
Fast Five (Chato (Yorgo Constantine))
Final Destination 2 (Deputy Steve (Aaron Douglas))
Good People (Khan (Omar Sy))
Mad Max: Fury Road (The Organic Mechanic (Angus Sampson))
Once Upon a Time in Mexico (Fideo (Marco Leonardi))
Power Rangers Lightspeed Rescue (Gatekeeper)
Snatch (2017 Blu-Ray edition) (Sol (Lennie James))
White Oleander (Teacher (Sam Catlin))

References

External links
 
 

Japanese male voice actors
Living people
1973 births